The West Bottoms is a historic industrial neighborhood of Kansas City, Missouri, immediately west of downtown and straddling the border of Kansas City, Missouri and Kansas City, Kansas. At the confluence of the Missouri River and the Kansas River, it faces Kaw Point, an early campsite of the Lewis and Clark Expedition. The region was originally settled by the native tribes, and this spot was permanently settled as French Bottoms in the early 1800s by François Chouteau for his trade with the tribes and early American pioneers. It is one of the oldest areas of the metro along with Westport. Its neighboring Quality Hill neighborhood is a historical center of the pioneer Town of Kansas, which became Kansas City, Missouri.

The West Bottoms is mostly characterized by brick high-rise historical industrial buildings, built in the early 1900s for major regional stockyards, train yards, and factories. Most of these were converted into art galleries, restaurants, shops, apartments, and corporate offices. Its antique shops and haunted house attractions are very popular.

History
The West Bottoms had Kansas City's first Union Depot. It had the Kansas City Live Stock Exchange and Kansas City Stockyards (now defunct), which prompted the huge annual American Royal livestock show at Kemper Arena, the site of the 1976 Republican National Convention. From the 1870s, it had a large industrial district of factories which produced plows and tractors, many still standing, including the Oliver Building, the Nichols and Shepard Building, and the John Deere Building.

In the early 1900s, many Serbian immigrants worked in the meat packing houses. Slavic immigrants founded the nearby historic neighborhood of Strawberry Hill, housing workers for the West Bottoms and the Fairfax District. Serbs founded St. George Serbian Orthodox Church on April 18, 1906. The community purchased two houses on North 1st Street. One was converted to a church and the other used as a parish home. The parish stayed in the West Bottoms until 1925.

The low-lying area has always been prone to floods, including the Great Flood of 1951 and the Great Flood of 1993.

Jim Pendergast founded the political machine here that was furthered by Tom Pendergast. Tom Pendergast was an early supporter and promoter of Harry S Truman in Jackson County and Missouri politics, who later became President. Jim started operations at the "Climax" Saloon on St. Louis Avenue, named for a winning race horse he had bet on.

During World War II, Darby Steel Corporation  built most of the landing craft tanks (LCTs) for various amphibious invasions. The plant built one craft per day and floated them more than  down the Missouri and Mississippi Rivers to New Orleans, Louisiana, prompting their "Prairie Ships" nickname. Darby's plant at the mouth of the Kansas River could hold eight 135í LCTs and 16 LCMs in various stages of construction.

Notable people
 Ed Asner, actor

References

Economy of Kansas City, Missouri
Neighborhoods in Kansas City, Missouri
Pendergast era